Isaiah Zagar (born 1939) is an American mosaic artist based in Philadelphia. He is notable for his murals, primarily in or around Philadelphia's South Street.

Early life
Zagar received his Bachelor of Arts from the Pratt Institute in Brooklyn, New York City. Soon after, Zagar met his wife, Julia. After getting married, the Zagars traveled to Peru to volunteer through the Peace Corps. Zagar was very inspired by Peruvian folk art during this time. After three years in Peru, the Zagars moved to South Philadelphia in 1968 where they opened the Eyes Gallery, a folk art shop on South Street. In December 1968, the Eyes Gallery was the site of Zagar's first mosaic; Zagar mosaiced it as a way to create a folk art environment for the art they were selling.

Works

Philadelphia's Magic Gardens, Zagar's largest South Street mosaic work, is both a three dimensional, immersive piece of installation art and a museum gallery space. The mosaics are inlaid with poetry, quotes, names of artists who have inspired Zagar, as well as portraits and forms of people and animals. The gardens utilize a variety of materials, including bottles, bike wheels and folk art. Zagar says of his personal creative inspirations,

In 1959 when I was 19 years old I was introduced to the folk art environment of Clarence Schmidt, My Mirrored Hope, Woodstock, New York, USA. Soon after in 1961 there was a groundbreaking exhibition at The Museum of Modern Art, in New York City called The Art of Assemblage. Because that exhibition included assemblages of artists like Pablo Picasso, Jean Dubuffet, Kurt Schwitters, Antonio Gaudi alongside of untrained brickaleurs Clarence Schmidt, Simon Rodia and Ferdinand Cheval that gave me as a trained artist the rationale to include their concepts as manifestations of fine art. At a crucial time in my life it allowed me to begin what could be called a life's work making the city of Philadelphia, Pennsylvania into a labyrinthine mosaic museum that incorporates all my varied knowledge and skills.

Zagar first began Philadelphia's Magic Gardens by cleaning up two vacant lots adjacent to a property he purchased in 1994. After clearing the lots, setting up a chain-link fence, and mosaicing his own property, he began to mosaic the fence and other parts of the abandoned lots.
In 2002 the owner of the lots demanded Zagar buy the property for $300,000 or he would have it demolished. Through fundraising, private donations, and a lot of community support, the property was able to be saved, and the nonprofit organization, Philadelphia's Magic Gardens, was formed.

From 1991 to 2000 Zagar mosaiced the entire outside of the Painted Bride Art Center on Vine Street between N. 2nd and N. 3rd Streets in the Old City neighborhood of Philadelphia, a work he entitled Skin of the Bride, which he donated to the center.

Zagar continues to create mosaic murals in Philadelphia, mainly around the South Street area. He has completed over 200 of these murals since 1968 and continues to work. He hosts a weekend workshop during the last weekend of each month April - October where participants can assist him in creating a new mural in the community. Much of Zagar's work is completed free of charge or is commissioned by businesses or people in the area. A walking tour is available from Philadelphia's Magic Gardens which takes visitors to 20 of these mosaic murals.

Awards and honors
Pew Charitable Trust Individual Artist Fellowship Grant of $50,000 for work in the interdisciplinary arts, Philadelphia, Pennsylvania 1995.
National Endowment for the Arts for sculpture, Washington, D.C. 1979.
Member of the Philadelphia Dumpster Divers Artists Association.

See also
In a Dream (film about Zagar, directed by his son, Jeremiah Zagar)

References

External links

Philadelphia's Magic Gardens
In A Dream: A Film by Jeremiah Zagar about Isaiah Zagar's life and work
Cinelan 3 minute video on Isaiah Zagar
Isaiah Zagar's Magic Gardens—Photo collection by Gabe Kirchheimer

Artists from Philadelphia
Pratt Institute alumni
Living people
1939 births
Mosaic artists
Pew Fellows in the Arts